

Events

Jean Cote married Anne Martin

Births

Deaths
 December 25 – Samuel de Champlain, explorer and founder of Quebec (b. c.1567)

References

1630s in Canada
Quebec, 1635 In
Years in Quebec